Carnsore Point ( or Ceann an Chairn) is a headland in the very South East corner of County Wexford, Ireland. This headland is Ireland's southern limit point of the Irish Sea, on the western side of St George's Channel.

Ptolemy's Geography (2nd century AD) described a point called Ιερον (Hieron, "sacred promontory") which probably referred to Carnsore Point.

Energy

Cancelled nuclear project
Carnsore was proposed to be the location of a Nuclear Energy Board power plant. If built as proposed in the 1970s, the plant would have produced electricity for the Electricity Supply Board. First proposed in 1968, the then Government of Ireland gave renewed effort to the plans after the 1973 energy crisis. The plan envisaged one, and eventually four, nuclear power stations. However, the plan was dropped in the late 1970s after opposition by environmental groups, including the Wexford group the Nuclear Safety Association. The campaign against the proposed plant also gained some international support, including from Petra Kelly, who gave a speech at Carnsore. One activist against the plant who later became notable was Adi Roche, who went on to found Chernobyl Children International.

Anti-nuclear groups organised a series of rallies and concerts at Carnsore Point from August 1978 to August 1981. Titled "Get to the Point" and "Back to the Point" respectively, and featuring Christy Moore as lead act, the concerts were served to bring to public notice the question of nuclear power in Ireland. The British and Irish Communist Organisation, who believed nuclear power was necessary to achieve socialism in Ireland, picketed the first concert.

Wind farm
As of 2002, the ESB Group proposed to build a wind farm in the area. The 12 megawatt wind farm began operations in 2003.

Notes

External links

 Nuclear Energy (An Bord Fuinnimh Núicléigh) Act, 1971
 Carnsore: Why Ireland never got nuclear power (archived 2004)

Headlands of County Wexford
Power stations in the Republic of Ireland
Wind farms in the Republic of Ireland
Cancelled nuclear power stations